Johann Steffens (1560–1616) was a German organist and composer. He was born in Itzehoe, and died in Lüneburg.

Aside from organ works his works include five-part German madrigals (1619) influenced by Hassler.

Selected recordings
North German Organ Baroque Volume 4 CPO
German madrigals. Himlische Cantorey, Hamburger Ratsmusik, Simone Eckert CPO 2013

References

1560 births
1616 deaths
German classical organists
German male organists
German classical composers
Renaissance composers
German male classical composers
Male classical organists